The Rossiter Case is a 1951 British crime film directed by Francis Searle and starring Helen Shingler, Clement McCallin, Sheila Burrell and Stanley Baker in a small role. A man has an affair with his disabled wife's sister - and when the sister is murdered, suspicion falls on him.

Cast
 Helen Shingler as Liz Rossiter 
 Clement McCallin as Peter Rossiter 
 Sheila Burrell as Honor 
 Frederick Leister as Sir James Ferguson 
 Ann Codrington as Marty 
 Henry Edwards as Doctor Bendix 
 Dorothy Batley as Nurse West 
 Gabrielle Blunt as Alice 
 Stanley Baker as Joe 
 Eleanor Bryan as Agnes 
 Ewen Solon as Inspector 
 Robert Percival as Sergeant 
 Dennis Castle as Constable 
 Frederic Steger as Hobson 
 Anthony Allen as Arthur

References

External links
 
 

1951 films
1951 crime drama films
1950s mystery films
British crime drama films
British mystery films
Films directed by Francis Searle
British films based on plays
Adultery in films
Hammer Film Productions films
British black-and-white films
1950s English-language films
1950s British films